Arnauld Mercier (born 4 June 1972) is a French former football player and current manager, who is unemployed after last managing Waasland-Beveren.

He spent most of his career playing in the French Ligue 2 and Championnat National, but had a spell in Italy where he played three seasons in Serie B. After his playing career, he became a coach, and managed RBDB and Seraing United.

Playing career
Born in Bayeux, Mercier began playing football for Ligue 2 side Rouen in 1990. After three seasons the club were relegated to the Championnat National, and he left for another third-tier club, Fécamp. Mercier spent three seasons with Fécamp and the following two with Valenciennes, continuing to play in the Championnat National.

In 1998, Mercier moved to Italy, joining Serie A side Reggina. He was unable to work his way into the first team and went on loan to Serie B sides Andria, Savoia and Cosenza. Disappointed, he returned to France and played two more seasons for Valenciennes.

Coaching career
After he retired from playing, Mercier began coaching the youth side of Valenciennes. He was appointed manager of Belgian side Royal Boussu Dour Borinage in April 2011.

On 2 January 2019, Mercier returned to Seraing United, this time as a sporting director.

References

External links
Profile at Lega Calcio
Profile at FFF
Profile at Footgoal.net

1972 births
Living people
French footballers
Association football defenders
Ligue 2 players
Serie B players
FC Rouen players
Valenciennes FC players
Reggina 1914 players
S.S. Fidelis Andria 1928 players
Cosenza Calcio 1914 players
French football managers
K.S.V. Roeselare managers
French expatriate footballers
French expatriate sportspeople in Italy
Expatriate footballers in Italy